Dixe Wills is an author and journalist, mostly writing green travel pieces for The Guardian. His previous books are The Z-Z of Great Britain, Places to Hide in England, Scotland and Wales, New World Order, and The Armchair Naturalist (as Johnson P. Johnson), all published by Icon Books.

In April 2010 his addition to the Cool Camping series, Tiny Campsites, was published by Punk Publishing. The book features 75 campsites across England, Scotland and Wales, all of an acre in size or under. Wills has said: "A small campsite will always triumph over a large one in the same way that a cosy boutique will ever prevail over a warehouse-like chain store. It's a matter of soul." His book Tiny Stations was the inspiration for the 2016 travel documentary series Paul Merton's Secret Stations.

Bibliography
 The Z-Z of Britain, 2005
 Places to Hide, 2006
 New World Order, 2007
 The Armchair Naturalist (as Johnson P. Johnson), 2007
 Tiny Campsites, 2010
 Fifty Walks in Sussex and the South Downs (with Nick Channer), 2013
 Fifty Walks in Brecon Beacons  and South Wales (with Tom Hutton), 2013
 Tiny Islands, 2013
 Tiny Stations, 2014
 At Night, 2015
 Tiny Churches, 2016
 Tiny Histories, 2017
 Tiny Britain, 2018
 Tiny Castles, 2019
 The Wisdom of Nature, 2019
 The Ultimate Bucket List, 2020

References

External links 
Dixe Wills' blog
Tiny Campsites website
Links to articles written by Dixe Wills

British travel writers
Living people
British male journalists
Year of birth missing (living people)